The pink and blue ribbon is a symbol for promoting:

 Baby loss awareness, including loss during and after pregnancy, stillbirth, miscarriage, termination for medical reasons, neonatal death and SIDS. Baby Loss Awareness week is from 9 to 15 October.
 Pregnancy and Infant Loss Remembrance Day is October 15 in Canada, United States, Australia, and UK.
 Pyloric stenosis awareness.
 Male breast cancer awareness.
 Pre-natal loss including miscarriage, ectopic pregnancy, stillbirth and prematurity.
 Infantile diseases and illnesses.

References

Miscarriage
Awareness ribbon
Stillbirth
Ectopic pregnancy
Preterm birth